The Centrumcross Surhuisterveen is a cyclo-cross race held in Surhuisterveen, Netherlands.

Past winners

References
 Men's results
 Women's results

Cycle races in the Netherlands
Cyclo-cross races
Recurring sporting events established in 1995
1995 establishments in the Netherlands
Cycling in Friesland
Sport in Achtkarspelen